

Sophisti-pop is a pop music subgenre that developed out of the British new wave movement during the mid-1980s. It originated with acts who blended elements of jazz, soul, and pop with lavish production. The term "sophisti-pop" was coined only after the genre's peak in the mid-late 1980s.

Characteristics
Sophisti-pop is characterized for its extensive use of electronic keyboards, synthesizers and polished arrangements. Artists also utilized cutting-edge studio technology and perfectionist recording methods. The genre has been described as mellow, romantic, and atmospheric.

History
Stylus Magazine suggested that acts had been influenced by the work of Roxy Music (such as 1982's Avalon, often cited as the first sophisti-pop album) and Bryan Ferry's Bête Noire (1987) and Boys and Girls (1985).

Sweetwater named major artists in the genre as including the Blue Nile, Prefab Sprout, the Style Council, Scritti Politti, Everything but the Girl, and Danny Wilson. AllMusic added Simply Red, Sade, Basia, and Swing Out Sister. Writer Iain Munn added to the list Level 42, the Blow Monkeys, and Joe Jackson's 1984 album Body and Soul.

The genre's popularity declined after the 1990s.

See also
List of sophisti-pop artists
Progressive soul
Plastic soul
Progressive pop
Quiet storm

References

Further reading

External links
Hue and Cry noting AllMusic's usage of the term.

 
Pop music genres
1980s in music
British styles of music
New wave music